The House of Peoples' Representatives is the lower house of the Ethiopian Federal Parliamentary Assembly. Located in the capital Addis Ababa, the House has 547 members. All are elected in theory for five-year term in single-seat constituencies. The proceedings in the chamber are led by Speaker of the House of Peoples' Representatives. Of the 547 seats, 122 are vacant.

History

2015 elections 

In 1995, Ethiopia's ethnic federalism system was set up, with a bicameral federal parliamentary assembly, of which the lower chamber with not more than 550 members as per the constitution. 22 of the 547 seats were reserved for representatives of minority nationalities.

2021 elections

Speakers of the House of Peoples' Representatives
The Speaker of the House of Peoples' Representatives is the presiding officer of the house of peoples representatives.

See also 

 House of Federation (upper house of the Federal Assembly)

References

External links
 The House of Peoples' Representatives

1995 establishments in Ethiopia
Ethiopia
Government of Ethiopia